is a 1916 musical comedy by Wilhelm Kienzl.

References

Operas
1916 operas
Operas by Wilhelm Kienzl
German-language operas